Parliamentary elections were held in Bolivia in May 1927 to elect members of the National Congress.

Results

References

Elections in Bolivia
Bolivia
Legislative election
Election and referendum articles with incomplete results
May 1927 events